Poetical Refugee is a 2001 French drama film directed by Abdellatif Kechiche, starring Sami Bouajila, Élodie Bouchez and Bruno Lochet. It was Kechiche‘s debut feature film and was awarded the Luigi De Laurentiis Award at the Venice Film Festival for best first film, winning seven awards, overall, at different film festivals.

Plot 
Like Voltaire‘s Candide in his eponymous novel, Jallel, a young North-African man, dreaming of better prospects, immigrates illegally to France. He struggles at first as he is unable to find work and finds it difficult to make friends. But soon he gets to sell fruits in the underground, albeit illegally. He also makes some new friends and then falls in love. But his dreams of success remain unrealized as he comes to discover and share the solidarity of the other outcasts going from one encounter to the other, making his way through Paris, from hostels to immigrant aid societies and social welfare groups, living among the excluded and the destitute.

Cast 
 Élodie Bouchez : Lucie
 Sami Bouajila : Jallel
 Aure Atika : Nassera
 Bruno Lochet : Franck
 Mustapha Adouani : Mostfa  
 Carole Franck : Barbara
 Virginie Darmon : Leila
 Olivier Loustau : Antonio
 François Genty : Paul
 Sami Zitouni : Nono
 Jean-Michel Fête : Philippe
 Manuel Le Lièvre : André

Critical reception
"With superb performances by Sami Bouajila (Bye Bye), Aure Atika and Elodie Bouchez (The Dream Life of Angels), Poetical Refugee offers a moving and tender portrayal of life on the margins, a review by Cinema of the World noted.

Accolades
Angers European First Film Festival-2001 
European Special Jury Award 
Jean Carmet Award for the ensemble of actors. 
 
Cologne Mediterranean Film Festival-2001  
Best Actress to Élodie Bouchez 
 
Namur International Festival of French-Speaking Film-2000  
Jury Special Prize 
Youth Jury Emile Cantillon Award 
nominated for Golden Bayard  Best Film (Meilleur Film Francophone)

Venice Film Festival-2000  
Cinema for Peace Award
Luigi De Laurentiis Award

References

External links 
 
  
 Poetical Refugee at UniFrance Films

2001 films
2001 drama films
2000s French-language films
Films directed by Abdel Kechiche
French drama films
2000s French films